Raipur West also known as Raipur Nagar Paschim Vidhan Sabha constituency is one of the 90 Vidhan Sabha (Legislative Assembly) constituencies of Chhattisgarh state in central India. The seat has formed after the demolition of Raipur Town Vidhansabha Constituency in 2008. It is a segment of Raipur (Lok Sabha constituency). It is part of Raipur district.

Members of Vidhan Sabha
As part of Madhya Pradesh Vidhan Sabha
 As Raipur seat 
 1967 : S C R Prasad (Jana Congress) 
 1972 : Sudhir Mukherji (IND) 
 As Raipur Town seat 
 1977 : Rajani D. P. Upasane (JNP)
 1980 : Swarupchand Jain (Congress)
As part of Chhattisgarh Vidhan Sabha
 As Raipur Town seat 
 2003 : Brijmohan Agrawal (BJP) (As Raipur Town seat, when Raipur had only 2 assembly seats)
 As "Raipur City West" seat:

Election results

2018 Election

2013 Election
 Rajesh Munat (BJP) : 64,611 votes 
 Vikas Upadhyay (INC) : 58,451

2003 Election
 Brijmohan Agrawal (BJP) : 70,164 votes 
 Gajraj Pagariya (INC) : 44190

1977 Election
 Rajani D. P. Upasane (JNP) : 17,925 votes 
 Sharda Charah Raghubar Prasad (INC) : 13065

1972 Election
 Sudhir mukherji (IND) : 30,347 votes
 Mansukh Lal S Chandeel (Jana Sangh) : 16882

See also
 Raipur  
 List of constituencies of the Chhattisgarh Legislative Assembly

References

Assembly constituencies of Chhattisgarh
Raipur district